This is a list of fictional crocodiles and alligators from literature, folklore and myth, mascots and emblems of teams and organizations, comics, films, animations and video games.

This list is subsidiary to the list of fictional animals. It is restricted to notable crocodilian characters from notable works of fiction. Characters that appear in multiple media may have separate listings for each appearance, while in instances where a character has appeared in several separate works in a single medium, only the earliest will be recorded here.

Literature

Folklore and myths

Mascots and emblems
Crocodiles and alligators are used as mascots and emblems by organisations and sports teams:

Albert and Alberta Gator of the Florida Gators, representing the University of Florida
Canton Crocodiles, a baseball team in the Frontier league.
Southern Districts football team in the Australian Northern Territory Football League.
"Ice-Gator" and "Lagoona Gator" are the mascots for Disney's Blizzard Beach and Disney's Typhoon Lagoon waterparks in Walt Disney World
Crocs brand footwear manufacturer logo
Lacoste logo.

Comics

Film

Animation

Video games

References

Crocodiles and Alligators

Crocodiles and alligators, fictional